Fedar Creek is a stream in the U.S. state of Idaho. It is a tributary of Granite Creek.

Fedar Creek was named after Charles Fedar, a local trapper.

References

Rivers of Bonner County, Idaho
Rivers of Idaho